Benton E. "Benny" Peyton (c. 1890 – January 24, 1965) was an American jazz drummer.

Peyton went with Will Marion Cook's Southern Syncopated Orchestra to Europe in 1919 and remained there, forming his own group in London, the Jazz Kings, out of members of Cook's orchestra. The group recorded two sides for Columbia Records in 1920 which were never issued; they also held a residence at the Hammersmith Palais in 1921. Peyton led his own band across Europe well into the 1930s, with June Cole, Big Boy Goudie and Tommy Ladnier among his sidemen. He toured the USSR with Sidney Bechet and Frank Withers (né Frank Douglas Withers; 1880–1952), and in 1935 played with Joe Turner and Adelaide Hall in Zurich.

In 1939 Peyton moved back to New York City, where he became active as an AFM union member. He continued playing professionally into the 1950s.

References

Eugene Chadbourne, [ Benny Peyton] at Allmusic
"Benny Peyton". The New Grove Dictionary of Jazz.

External links
 Howard Rye, "The Jazz Kings and Other Spin-Off Groups", Black Music Research Journal, Volume 30, Number 1, Spring 2010, pp. 85–92 | 10.1353/bmr.2010.0001

American jazz drummers
American jazz bandleaders
1965 deaths
Year of birth uncertain